Battelle may refer to:

Places
 Battelle, Alabama, unincorporated community in Alabama
 Battelle Darby Creek Metro Park, metropolitan park located southwest of Columbus, Ohio
 Battelle Hall, multi-purpose arena and exhibit hall located in Columbus, Ohio

Organizations
 Battelle for Kids, non-profit organization focusing on educational improvement, headquartered in Columbus, Ohio
 Battelle Memorial Institute, R&D organization that manages eight national laboratories, headquartered in Columbus, Ohio

People
 Ann Battelle (born 1968), American skier
 Annie Maude Norton Battelle (1865-1925), American suffragette and philanthropist
 Ebenezer Battle also known as Ebenezer Battelle, American politician, and patriot who fought in the American Revolutionary War
 Ebenezer Battelle (1754–1815), American bookseller and patriot who fought in the American Revolutionary War
 Gordon Battelle (minister) (1814-1862), American Methodist minister, abolitionist, Union Army chaplain, and delegate to the West Virginia Constitutional Convention
 Gordon Battelle (1883–1923), American metallurgist and founder of the Battelle Memorial Institute
 John Battelle, (born 1965) American entrepreneur, author, and journalist
 Kenneth Battelle, birth name of Mr. Kenneth (1927-2013), American celebrity hairdresser
 Shane Battelle (born 1971), American soccer player
 Steven Battelle, lead singer, guitarist, writer, and co-founder of the British rock band LostAlone

See also
 Battle (disambiguation)